Paul Henshall (born 1977 in Staffordshire) is a British actor.  He uses a wheelchair because he has cerebral palsy.

Paul is best known for playing the roles of medical student Dean West in Holby City, and Paul in I'm With Stupid. He has also had roles in A Thing Called Love, Casualty and the film The Confusion of Tongues (2014).  Henshall also performed in the 2007 Edinburgh Fringe Festival in a new play for 'Liberated Theatre' called "Mutton" at the Gillded Balloon.  He was seen as Alan in Rock Rivals in 2008.

In June 2015, he appeared in two 'Blue Badge' specials of Off Their Rockers on ITV.

He lives in Truro.

Education 
Paul graduated from Manchester Metropolitan University's Theatre School in 2001, where he was the first disabled person in the country to gain a BADC certificate in stage combat (armed and unarmed).

References

External links

Alumni of Manchester Metropolitan University
English male television actors
Living people
1977 births
Actors from Staffordshire
People with cerebral palsy
People from Truro